Evgeny Ellinovich Sveshnikov (11 February 1950 – 18 August 2021) was a Russian chess player and writer. He was awarded the title of Grandmaster by FIDE in 1977.

Chess career
Sveshnikov played in his first USSR Chess Championship when he was 17 years old. He was awarded by FIDE the titles International Master in 1975 and Grandmaster in 1977.

In his early international competitions, he was a joint winner at Decin 1974, shared first place (with Lev Polugaevsky) at Sochi 1976 and won category 8 tournaments at Le Havre 1977 and Cienfuegos 1979. At Novi Sad in 1979, he shared second prize with Efim Geller behind Florin Gheorghiu. At Wijk aan Zee in 1981, he shared 3rd place and in 1983, was joint champion of Moscow. Sveshnikov won the Latvian Chess Championship in 2003 and 2010. In 2017, Sveshnikov won the 65+ section of the World Senior Chess Championship.

In team competitions, he played on the gold medal-winning Soviet team in the 1976 World Student Team Chess Championship, and was selected as a reserve for the Soviet side participating at the 1977 European Team Chess Championship in Moscow. Although only an international master at the time, he registered a score of 80%, winning individual and team gold medals. He represented Latvia at the Chess Olympiads of 2004, 2006, 2008, and 2010, and at the European Team Championship in 2011. In 2016 he was the top board of the gold medal-winning Russian team in the 65+ section of the World Senior Team Championship.

A critic of the system
 
Known as one of the most outspoken and controversial grandmasters on the circuit, Sveshnikov became linked with player revolts over the handing in of gamescores. It was (and is) accepted practice that players submit copies of their gamescores to tournament organisers and these games later appear on the internet, in books, magazines and in database programs. Sveshnikov insisted that it was not in the best interests of chess professionals to allow this to continue.

He contended that gamescores were the labors and intellectual property of the two players concerned and therefore copyright permissions and royalty fees should apply. It is morally corrupt, he argued, that only authors, editors and owners of Chess Publishing Houses profit from the publication of gamescores. Effectively, players are even prevented from producing an exclusive book of their own best games as an investment for their retirement. He also questioned the wisdom of handing over such detailed information to future opponents, who would utilise databases to improve their chances of victory, regardless of original thought or chess-playing ability.

The theoretician

It is, however, the work that Sveshnikov did with his close friend Grandmaster Gennady Timoshchenko during the 1960s and 1970s that bears greatest testimony to his chess achievements.

Previously known as the Lasker-Pelikan variation of the Sicilian Defence, Sveshnikov's system was considered of dubious merit until he transformed it into an exciting and fully playable opening. The balance between winning and losing is often on a knife edge, making it an attractive proposition for black players seeking the full point. Mark Taimanov, in an interview, described it as chess opening theory's "last great discovery". That it is now regularly played by the world's leading grandmasters lends credence to this view. Vladimir Kramnik and Valery Salov are regarded as expert practitioners of the Sicilian Sveshnikov (categorised by the moves 1.e4 c5 2.Nf3 Nc6 3.d4 cxd4 4.Nxd4 Nf6 5.Nc3 e5 - the Sveshnikov 'proper' continuing 6.Ndb5 d6), but Kasparov, Shirov, Leko and Khalifman have also enjoyed success with it. Moreover, Magnus Carlsen employed this opening several times during the World Chess Championship 2018 match with Fabiano Caruana. The opening is rich in its tactical possibilities and despite being subjected to deep analysis, continues to flourish with new ideas being regularly unearthed. Sveshnikov authored a comprehensive book on this variation titled The Sicilian Pelikan.

He was also a pioneer in the development of the Advance Variation of the French Defence and of the Alapin Variation of the Sicilian Defence.

Personal life and death

His son, Vladimir Sveshnikov, is a chess player with the title of International Master. 

Evgeny died from complications of COVID-19 on 18 August 2021, at the age of 71. His death came shortly after the death of his mother.

Notable games
Evgeny Sveshnikov vs Ruslan Sherbakov, Moscow ch-URS 1991, Sicilian Rossolimo, 1-0 White expertly probes on the kingside to create weaknesses on the dark squares and then springs a surprise mating net, commencing with a queen sacrifice.
Evgeny Sveshnikov vs Igor Ivanov, Russia 1976, Caro Kann, 1-0 White initiates early razor-sharp tactics and concludes the game with a stylish mating attack.

References

CHESS magazine, Vol.63, September 1998, pp. 49–52.

External links

Evgeny Sveshnikov chess games at 365Chess.com

Jevgēņijs Svešņikovs team chess record at Olimpbase.org
Interview with Evgeny Sveshnikov  by Scacchierando.net – via Chessdom.com

1950 births
2021 deaths
Deaths from the COVID-19 pandemic in Russia
Chess grandmasters
Chess Olympiad competitors
Chess theoreticians
Chess coaches
Russian chess players
Latvian chess players
Soviet chess players
Russian chess writers
Latvian chess writers
World Senior Chess Champions
Sportspeople from Chelyabinsk
Russian and Soviet emigrants to Latvia